Funa jeffreysii, common name Jeffrey's turrid,  is a species of sea snail, a marine gastropod mollusk in the family Pseudomelatomidae, the turrids and allies

Description
The length of the shell varies between 30 mm and 55 mm.

The shell contains about 13 whorls. These are angular convex and concave above. Its color is buff, finely mottled all over with reddish-brown, purplish on the spire, especially between the folds. It  is sculptured with oblique longitudinal folds (11 on the penultimate whorl) which stop abruptly at the shoulder and gradually decrease below. The spirals are rather spaced, coarse and unequal, alternating in size, absent on the concave upper surface of the whorls. The surface between lirae and over the concave anal fasciole is finely spirally striate. The aperture is subrhombic, narrowed below, slightly over one-third the shell's length. The siphonal canal is a little recurved. The anal sinus is very deep and straight. The outer lip is arched forward, with a distinct subbasal sinus. The columella is moderately calloused and nearly straight below, bearing a callous tubercle above.

Distribution
This marine species occurs off Japan, Korea China and the Philippines.

References

 Nomura, S. & Hatai, K.M. (1940) The marine fauna of Kyûroku-shima and its vicinity, northeast Honsyû, Japan. Saito Ho-on Kai Museum of Natural History Research Bulletin, 19, 57–115, pls. 3–4.
 Liu J.Y. [Ruiyu] (ed.). (2008). Checklist of marine biota of China seas. China Science Press. 1267 pp
 Li B.Q., Kilburn R.N., & Li X.Z. (2010). Report on Crassispirinae Morrison, (Mollusca: Neogastropoda: Turridae) from the China Seas. Journal of Natural History. 44, 699-740

External links
 Smith E.A. (1875). A list of the Gasteropoda collected in Japanese seas by Commander H. C. St. John, R. N. Annals and Magazine of Natural History. ser. 4, 15: 414-427
 
 

jeffreysii
Gastropods described in 1875